Magnolia Network is a Canadian English language specialty channel that broadcasts lifestyle programming related to home design, renovations, and food. The channel's brand and much of its foreign programming is licensed from its American namesake, Magnolia Network. The channel is a joint venture between HGTV Canada Inc., a subsidiary of Corus Entertainment (80.24% and managing partner) and Warner Bros. Discovery (who owns the remaining 19.76%).

The channel first launched on October 19, 2009 as the localized version DIY Network, under the ownership of CW Media, a joint venture between Canwest and Goldman Sachs, and Scripps Networks Interactive. Between ownership changes, the channel adopted its current name following its American counterpart in 2022.

History
Alliance Atlantis was granted approval for the channel under the name D.I.Y. Television by the Canadian Radio-television and Telecommunications Commission (CRTC) on November 24, 2000. Under the CRTC's approval, the channel was described as a "service designed for the do-it-yourselfer of all levels... entirely devoted to programs that offer Canadians an interactive television experience that provides immediate access to detailed step by step instructions, in-depth demonstrations, and tips for do-it-yourself projects." The channel, however, was never launched and its licence expired. Alliance Atlantis re-applied for the channel and was approved on October 21, 2005 with an almost identical nature of service description as the original licence granted in 2000.

On January 18, 2008, a joint venture between Canwest and Goldman Sachs Capital Partners known as CW Media bought Alliance Atlantis's specialty networks, including the licence for the yet unlaunched D.I.Y. Television.

In late 2009, Canwest announced that it would launch the channel on October 19, 2009 in standard definition, as DIY Network, a Canadian version of the U.S. channel of the same name. On many television service providers, DIY Network replaced Fine Living, which ceased operations the same day. Corus Entertainment initially owned a 12% stake at the channel's launch, but then it later sold its stake to CW Media in February 2010. Programming on the channel was primarily devoted to do it yourself home improvement projects, with the majority of programming consisting of reruns from its sister network, HGTV Canada and licensed programs from the American DIY Network. 

On October 27, 2010, Shaw Communications gained control of DIY Network as a result of its acquisition of Canwest and Goldman Sachs' interest in CW Media. 

A high definition simulcast launched in February 2016.

The channel came under Corus Entertainment ownership on April 1, 2016, when Corus Entertainment decided to acquire all of Shaw's broadcasting assets.

On March 1, 2022, it was announced that DIY Network would relaunch as a Canadian version of Magnolia Network—the current incarnation of the channel's American counterpart, on March 28, 2022. As in the U.S. prior to its own linear launch in January 2022, Magnolia Network content was available via Discovery+ upon its Canadian launch in October 2021 (which had Corus as a partner).

On February 22, 2023, Magnolia Network was added to the Global TV app, along with Lifetime. It is expected to be added to StackTV at a possible later date.

Programming
As with the U.S. counterpart, in the past, DIY Network's programming focused on:
 Home construction (Building Off the Grid)
 Home repair or restoration (Bath Crashers, Blog Cabin, Ed the Plumber, Kitchen Crashers, Maine Cabin Masters, Restored, Sweat Equity)
 Home improvement (The Vanilla Ice Project, BATHtastic, Mega Dens, Man Caves, Cool Tools)
 Gardening and landscaping (Yard Crashers) 
 Building and contracting (Million Dollar Contractor, Sledgehammer, Barnwood Builders, Texas Flip and Move)

Earlier shows included a variety of topics, including auto repair, jewelry design, plumbing, boating, knitting and quilting, and woodworking. DIY's renovation shows included programs that had a specific historical restoration focus, like Restored, and some shows had specific geographic focuses, like shows outlining historical restorations in Virginia  and South Carolina, for example.

The network also carried This Old House repeats until the mid-2010s, when the property moved to other outlets. As recently as late-2009, it aired some older HGTV archive programming, including the Carol Duvall Show.

As Magnolia Network, the channel carries a similar mixture of personality-based series relating to home design, construction, renovation, and landscaping, with new original programming, and programs carried over from DIY Network (including Barnwood Builders, Building Off the Grid, and returning reruns of This Old House, among others). The network's scope was also expanded to include food-oriented series, such as Family Dinner and Magnolia Table with Joanna Gaines, and other series such as Extraordinary Stories Behind Everyday Things.

The channel currently fulfils its Canadian content remit with the scheduling of library content from the domestic HGTV, as there are no plans for Canadian-based content for Magnolia Network itself.

References

External links
 

English-language television stations in Canada
Digital cable television networks in Canada
Corus Entertainment networks
Television channels and stations established in 2009
Television channels and stations established in 2022
2022 establishments in Canada